Irwan Fadzli bin Idrus (born 2 June 1981) is Malaysian former footballer who played as a defender. He is a former member of the Malaysian national team.

He has played for the Malaysian under 23 squad for the 2001 and 2003 SEA Games, 2002 Asian Games, 2004 Olympic qualifier, and participate in 2002 Tiger Cup and 2007 ASEAN Football Championship with the national senior team. He also part of Malaysia XI squad in a match against Chelsea on 29 July 2008 at Shah Alam Stadium where Malaysia XI eventually lost 0-2.

International goals

References

External links
 
 

1981 births
Living people
Malaysian people of Malay descent
Malaysian footballers
Kedah Darul Aman F.C. players
Negeri Sembilan FA players
Malaysia international footballers
People from Kedah
Footballers at the 2002 Asian Games
Southeast Asian Games silver medalists for Malaysia
Southeast Asian Games medalists in football
Association football defenders
Competitors at the 2001 Southeast Asian Games
Competitors at the 2003 Southeast Asian Games
Asian Games competitors for Malaysia